Jürgen Bräuninger (13 September 1956 – 6 May 2019) was a German-born South African composer.

Jürgen Bräuninger studied at the State University of Music and Performing Arts Stuttgart with Ulrich Süsse and Erhard Karkoschka and at San Jose State University, California, with Allen Strange and Dan Wyman. He contributed to films such as The Lawnmower Man and The Dead Pit. His work has been performed by the Stuttgart Radio Symphony Orchestra, the Stockholm Saxophone Quartet, the SÜDPOOL Ensemble, and the Stuttgarter Kammerorchester as well as many other talented and recognized individual artists. He was commissioned by Süddeutscher Rundfunk Stuttgart and Südwestrundfunk. Bräuninger works have been realized at Gerald LaPierre Electro-Acoustic Music Studio and Studio für elektronische Musik. He was an associate professor in the School of Music, at the University of KwaZulu-Natal, in Durban, South Africa, where he lectured mainly in composition and music technology. Bräuninger died on 6 May 2019 at the age of 62.

References

External links 
 
 EMF Media

2019 deaths
South African composers
South African male composers
State University of Music and Performing Arts Stuttgart alumni
German emigrants to South Africa
South African people of German descent
1956 births
Deaths from cancer in South Africa